Eliyahu Brudny is an American Haredi rabbi and rosh yeshiva. He serves as maggid shiur in the Mir Yeshiva in Brooklyn and is a member of the Moetzes Gedolei HaTorah of Agudath Israel of America.

Early life 
Elya Brudny was born to Shmuel and Rochel Brudny. As a child, his parents sent him and his brother Abba to Yeshiva Torah Vodaath.

Career 

Brudny serves as a leading rosh yeshiva in the Mir Yeshiva in Brooklyn, and as a member of the Moetzes Gedolei HaTorah. His opinion is often sought by the Haredi Jewish community, with his views often being printed in the English-edition Hamodia, the Flatbush Jewish Journal, and Mishpacha magazine. Brudny is often invited to speak at public events such as the Agudah convention and funerals, and said the kaddish at the 2020 Siyum Hashas.

In 2018, when New York State Education Commissioner MaryEllen Elia issued a directive to all yeshivas operating in New York to come into compliance with statewide educational standards, or otherwise face the penalty of losing public funding earmarked for record – keeping, school meals and computers, Brudny authored an opinion letter together with Yisroel Reisman in The Wall Street Journal opposing these measures. The pair later complained about being rebuffed by Elia when they tried to negotiate with her about the measures.

References

External links 
 Brudny, Elya and Reisman, Yisroel "New York State Targets Jewish Schools: Albany Bureaucrats Want to Commandeer our Curriculum. We Won’t Have It" The Wall Street Journal.
 Rabbi Elya Brudny's lectures on TorahAnytime.com
 Rabbi Elya Brudny's lectures on Torahdownloads.com

Living people
Orthodox rabbis from New York City
Mir rosh yeshivas
Moetzes Gedolei HaTorah
Year of birth missing (living people)